The Cambridge History of Russia is a multi-volume survey of Russian history published by Cambridge University Press (CUP).

The volumes are:
 Vol. 1. From Early Rus' to 1689 edited by Maureen Perrie, covering Russian history before Peter the Great
 Vol. 2. Imperial Russia, 1689–1917 edited by Dominic Lieven, covering the Russian Empire
 Vol. 3. The Twentieth Century edited by Ronald Grigor Suny, covering Russian history after the October Revolution, including the Soviet Union

See also
The Cambridge History of Russian Literature
The Cambridge History of Inner Asia, which includes many chapters on nomadic and forest people in present-day Russia

References

External links
 Cambridge University Press,  The Cambridge History of Russia



2006 non-fiction books
Cambridge University Press books
History books about Russia
Cambridge
Russian studies